Samantha Warriner (born 1 August 1971) is a retired triathlete who represented New Zealand in triathlons ranging from sprint distance up to the Ironman. She was born in Alton, Hampshire, England. She turned professional at the end of 2005 after competing internationally for 3 years while teaching full-time at Whangarei Girls High School.

Career 
Warriner first competed in the triathlon at the 2004 Summer Olympics, finishing eighteenth.

In 2005 Warriner had her first win on the ITU World Circuit on 15 May 2005 in Ishigaki in an ITU World Cup. She followed this up with a win in the Hamburg ITU World Cup in Germany on 6 August 2005.

She placed 9th on the all-time list of female winners in the ITU World Cup. In 2008 Warriner won the overall ITU World Cup series. Going into the final round of the ITU World Cup, Samantha was in 2nd position, and needed to finish 7th or above in the finale in Huatulco.  She won the final round and took the 2008 ITU World Cup Championship. She was awarded the ITU World Cup at the Madrid ITU World Congress at the beginning of December. In 2008, she finished 16th in the Olympic triathlon.

In 2009 Sam won the Port of Tauranga Half Ironman in a course record time of 4:10:47.

After racing ITU triathlon Sam went on to win 7 x Ironman 70.3 events around the world.

In 2010 Samantha underwent heart surgery for super-ventricular tachycardia, 12 weeks later she won the Kelloggs Nutrigrain Ironman NZ in Taupo, New Zealand. Only 3 other women in the history of triathlon had won the ITU World Series and an Ironman in their career.

Later career 
Warriner runs a coaching business called Sweat7 Coaching based in Taupo New Zealand, with her husband Stephen Bradley. Warriner gave birth to daughter Lola-Rose in 2012. The team have coached 4 x ITU World Champions (2 Elite, 2 Age Group), and a Paralympic Silver Medalist, along with numerous age group triathletes. She is sponsored by; Asics, Blueseventy, and Sweat7 Coaching.

Achievements
2009
1st – Ironman 70.3 Geelong (Geelong, Australia)

References

External links 
 Profile
 Sam's official website

1971 births
Living people
Olympic triathletes of New Zealand
Triathletes at the 2004 Summer Olympics
Triathletes at the 2008 Summer Olympics
Triathletes at the 2006 Commonwealth Games
Commonwealth Games silver medallists for New Zealand
People from Alton, Hampshire
New Zealand female triathletes
Commonwealth Games medallists in triathlon
20th-century New Zealand women
21st-century New Zealand women
Medallists at the 2006 Commonwealth Games